The Cluain Conmhaícne (Conmaicne of the pasture), or Cluain Conmaicne, were an early people of Ireland. Their tuath comprised the entire parish of Cloone, located in the baronies of Maigh Rein (Mohill) and Carrigallen, in south County Leitrim.

Origin
The Conmhaicne or Conmaicne were a people of early Ireland, perhaps related to the Laigin, who dispersed to various parts of Ireland. They settled in Connacht and Longford, giving their name to several Conmaicne territories. Other branches of the Conmhaicne located in County Leitrim included the Conmaicne of Maigh Rein, Maigh Nissi, and Conmaicne Luchan.

Territory

Their territory was bounded by native Irish forests on all sides, Conmaiche of Maigh Rein west, Conmaicne of Maigh Nissi south, Conmaicne of Angaile to the east, and Breifne O'Reilly to the north.

Taoiseach
Cluain Conmaicne was part of Muintir Eolais and therefore ruled by MagRaghnaill (Reynolds).

People
 Saint Berach was born at Gort na Luachra in Cloone Conmaicne, living with this tuath for seven years. Plummer states that, in 1922, the townland contains "a mother-church and a cross, and the stone on which St. Berach was born".
 Saint Midabaria, sister of Berach, was also born at Gort na Luachra in Cloone Conmaicne.

See also
 Conmhaicne
 Cloone

References

Secondary sources

 A Chorographical Description of West or H-Iar Connaught written A.D. 1684 by Roderic O'Flaherty ESQ with notes and Illustrations by, James Hardiman M.R.I.A., Irish Archaeological Society, 1846.

History of County Leitrim
Historical ethnic groups of Europe
Ethnic groups in Ireland
Gaelic-Irish nations and dynasties
Cluain Conmaicne